Pilsbryspira nodata is a species of sea snail, a marine gastropod mollusk in the family Pseudomelatomidae, the turrids.

Description
The length of the shell attains 13 mm.

Distribution
P. nodata can be found in the Gulf of Mexico, ranging from the eastern coast of Florida to Venezuela.

References

 Smith E.A. (1882). Diagnoses of new species of Pleurotomidae in the British Museum. Annals and Magazine of Natural History. ser. 5, 10: 206-218

External links
 Adams, C. B. 1850. Description of supposed new species of marine shells which inhabit Jamaica. Contributions to Conchology, 4: 56-68, 109-123
 
 Gastropods.com: Pilsbryspira nodata
 Rosenberg, G.; Moretzsohn, F.; García, E. F. (2009). Gastropoda (Mollusca) of the Gulf of Mexico, Pp. 579–699 in: Felder, D.L. and D.K. Camp (eds.), Gulf of Mexico–Origins, Waters, and Biota. Texas A&M Press, College Station, Texas.

nodata
Gastropods described in 1850
Taxa named by Charles Baker Adams